This is a list of wars involving North Korea and its predecessor states.

List

Joseon: 1392–1897

Korean Empire: 1897–1910

Occupied Korea: 1910–1945

North Korea: 1948–present

See also

 Korean People's Army
 List of wars involving Korea
 List of wars involving South Korea

Notes

References

North Korea
Wars